Elisebeht Markström, (born December 14, 1955) is a Swedish social democratic politician who has been a member of the Riksdag since 1995. Markström lives openly homosexual in Sweden.

References

External links
Elisebeht Markström at the Riksdag website

1955 births
Living people
Members of the Riksdag from the Social Democrats
Women members of the Riksdag
Lesbian politicians
Swedish LGBT politicians
Members of the Riksdag 2002–2006
21st-century Swedish women politicians
LGBT legislators